K.G.F: Chapter 2 is a 2022 Indian Kannada-language period action film written and directed by Prashanth Neel, and produced by Vijay Kiragandur under the banner Hombale Films. The second installment in a two-part series, it serves as a sequel to the 2018 film K.G.F: Chapter 1. The film stars an ensemble cast of Yash, Sanjay Dutt, Raveena Tandon, Srinidhi Shetty, Prakash Raj, Archana Jois, Achyuth Kumar, Rao Ramesh, Vasishta N. Simha, T. S. Nagabharana and Malavika Avinash. In the film, Rocky takes over the K.G.F, and must retain his supremacy over adversaries and government officials, including Suryavardhan's brother Adheera, Ramika Sen and his employers.

Produced on a budget of 100 crore, K.G.F: Chapter 2 is the most expensive Kannada film ever made. Neel retained the technicians from its predecessor with Bhuvan Gowda handling the cinematography and Ravi Basrur composed the film score and songs. Dutt and Tandon joined the cast in early 2019, marking the former's Kannada film debut. Portions of the film were shot back-to-back with Chapter 1. Principal photography for the rest of the sequences commenced in March 2019, but was halted in February 2020 owing to the COVID-19 lockdown in India. Filming resumed five months later and was completed in December 2020. Locations included Bangalore, Hyderabad, Mysore and Kolar.

K.G.F: Chapter 2 was theatrically released in India on 14 April 2022 in Kannada, along with dubbed versions in Hindi, Telugu, Tamil and Malayalam languages. It is also the first Kannada film to release in IMAX. The film received mixed reviews from critics who praised the acting, cinematography and soundtrack but criticised the writing pacing as well as it's depiction of female characters. It recorded the second highest-opening day in India, set domestic opening day records in Kannada, Hindi and Malayalam, and surpassed the lifetime gross of its predecessor in two days to become the highest-grossing Kannada film. With earnings of  crore globally, K.G.F: Chapter 2 is the fourth highest-grossing Indian film worldwide, and the second highest-grossing film in India, and the second highest-grossing Indian film of 2022 after RRR.

Plot 
After detailing the events in K.G.F: Chapter 1, Anand Ingalagi suffers a stroke and his son, Vijayendra Ingalagi takes over to narrate the rest of the story. Rocky kills heir apparent Virat and takes over the K.G.F, keeping Reena hostage to ensure the cooperation of Guru Pandian, Andrews, Rajendra Desai and kills Kamal when he protests.. Rocky issues orders to start work in eight hidden mines, While Vanaram, who was captured by Rocky, decided to help him.

Meanwhile, Adheera resurfaces and kills all guards at an outpost. In a ruse to bring Rocky to Adheera, Andrews kills Desai to lure Reena outside K.G.F, and John abducts Reena as per Adheera's order. While trying to save Reena, Adheera shoots Rocky but spares his life, while his men roadblock all gold exports from K.G.F. Later, Shetty ties up with other subordinates of Andrews across India's western coast and exterminates Rocky's allies with Inayat Khalil's newfound support, but Rocky's aides kill Shetty's associates and recapture the coast. A recuperated Rocky, along with Reena, visits Dubai to deal in gold with Khalil, and also buys Kalashnikovs from him. Rocky and his gang gravely wound Adheera and kill his henchmen with their newly acquired weapons. Exasperated with K.G.F, some central ministers had planned a no-confidence motion against the DYSS-supported government to bring Ramika Sen in power, but Rocky's henchmen threaten other ministers against the vote and the motion fails. Rocky also kills Shetty, gaining control over Bombay. Pandian warns Rocky of Sen's rising stature, but he disregards him.

In 1981, Ramika Sen wins the Indian general elections and becomes the Prime Minister. After CBI officer Kanneganti Raghavan briefs her about the situation in K.G.F, Sen authorises Raghavan to raid Rocky's warehouses. A young Ingalagi is caught spying by Rocky's henchmen, but Rocky gets impressed by his integrity. The CBI finds nothing in their raids except for a 400 gram-gold bar. Rocky retrieves it from a police station and singlehandedly destroys the police station using a M2 Browning machine gun. Rocky halts all exports from K.G.F, which strains relations with Khalil, but continues the mining. His aides trace his biological father, a drunkard who abandoned his family, and pays the unaware man to take care of Shanti's newly shifted grave. Reena confesses her feelings to Rocky and they get married. Rocky meets with Sen and hands her a file exposing his involvement in money laundering, but she cannot consider it as almost all her party members are complicit in the corruption.

Still furious after his defeat, Adheera makes his way to K.G.F through a secret passage with Andrews, Daya and John, supported by Khalil's armada. Just as Reena reveals her pregnancy to Rocky, Adheera fatally snipes her. In the ensuing clash, Rocky's army kill Andrews and Daya, while Rocky kills John and chokes Adheera to death. Rocky and his henchmen disrupt Sen's speech at the Parliament and kill Pandian (who had staged the attack on Garuda for which Adheera was framed, and informed Adheera of Garuda's attack priorly. He was also the one who showed Adheera the secret passage, goaded Andrews into hiring Rocky, staged the no-confidence motion in Delhi, and persuaded Shetty to join forces with Khalil just to gain Rocky's trust). Sen issues a death warrant against Rocky and enforces the Indian Army. Rocky evacuates K.G.F and leaves on a ship with his cache of gold. Before leaving, Rocky forms a new colony for all K.G.F workers. He signals his whereabouts to the Navy, but refuses to surrender. Sen issues orders to bomb K.G.F and Rocky's ship, and he drowns in the ocean along with the gold, which stays lost till date. Enthusiased with Rocky's life, a young Ingalagi decides to write a book on Rocky.

In the post-credits scene three months before Rocky's death, John Booker, an CIA agent hands over a file consisting of Rocky's crimes in the USA and 16 other countries between 1978 and 1981, to Ramika Sen. In the present, the peon of 24/News channel finds a final draft of K.G.F: Chapter 3.

Cast

Production

Development 
Prashanth Neel, worked on the film's screenplay after the release of Ugramm (2014), and development of the film began in early 2015. However, he decided to split the film in two parts, as the narration of this story is in a non-linear format, and the decision to split the film into two parts, also had to with the commercial prospects. In an interview with The Times of India, in October 2018, he added "The scale of the project is huge and we had a scope for a beginning, an interval and an end for both parts, so it made sense for us to release it as two parts". As for the decision to make it multilingual, he says that it was because the film is based on a unique idea and has a universal theme. In December 2020, Prashanth Neel said that there were no plans for a third instalment in the K.G.F franchise.

Prashanth Neel decided to rope in composer Ravi Basrur and cinematographer Bhuvan Gowda as a part of the technical crew for the second part of the film.

Casting 

While Yash, Srinidhi Shetty, Vasishta N. Simha, Achyuth Kumar, Malavika Avinash, T.S Nagabharana and other remaining actors from the first part have reprised their respective roles, Sanjay Dutt was roped in for a pivotal role in February 2019. Media rumours that Raveena Tandon would appear in the film started making rounds as early as February 2019. A news report in The Times of India confirmed that Tandon will be seen in a "major role" in the film. Despite Srinidhi becoming a breakout star, post the release of the predecessor, she rejected seven films, in order to start shoot for the film. The makers hosted an audition in April 2019, for aspiring actors who want to become a part of the film's cast.

On 29 July 2019, Sanjay Dutt was revealed to be playing the role of the main antagonist Adheera, marking his Kannada debut. He compared his character to Thanos, and revealed that it was "shown to be a dangerous character with scary makeup" and added that it was a role he was looking for. Raveena Tandon was reported to play the role of Prime Minister Ramika Sen, and stated that "it was a difficult character to portray".

Telugu actor Rao Ramesh was cast in a pivotal role in May 2019, and Tamil actor Saran Shakthi was cast in August 2019. On 26 August 2020, when the filming resumed, Prakash Raj was also revealed to be playing an important character.

Filming 
Before the release of its predecessor in December 2018, the makers shot 20% of its second part, and the crew went on double shifts till January 2019. On 4 January, it was announced that they have completed 15% of the shooting, and planned to resume the shooting of the film in the summer of 2019.

Filming for K.G.F: Chapter 2 started on 13 March 2019 in Hyderabad, with a formal puja ceremony. After an initial round of filming near Bangalore in May 2019, Yash announced that he will join the sets only in June 2019. The film's shooting started on 4 June at the Lalita Mahal Palace in Mysore, although Yash joined the sets on 6 June. Later the shoot commenced in August 2019 at Cyanide Hills in Kolar Gold Fields. On 28 August 2019, N Srinivas, president of the KGF's National Citizens Party filed a petition against the makers and alleged that the film is being shot in the protected area of cyanide mound and is damaging the nature. The JMFC court has issued an injunction notice to the producer Kiragandur, also ordering to stall the shoot. On 4 September, the producers claimed that the stay order was issued a day before the makers planned to wrap the shoot schedule. The same day, the makers started shooting for the second schedule in Hyderabad. On 25 September 2019, Sanjay Dutt joined the sets of the film in Hyderabad. After winning the court stay order on 27 September, the makers returned to shoot the film at Cyanide Hills. On 14 October 2019, the makers returned to Karnataka, after filming the extensive schedule in Hyderabad.

As of 27 January 2020, the makers completed 80% of the shoot. With the schedule being filmed in Mysore, the last leg of shoot was expected to be held in Hyderabad, and then in Bangalore and Kolar. On 3 February 2020, behind-the-scenes video of Yash shooting at the Infosys campus in Mysore went viral. On 10 February, Telugu actor Rao Ramesh joined the sets of the film. Raveena Tandon joined the sets of the film in Mysore on 12 February. After the second schedule of the film held in Mysore got completed, the makers headed to Hyderabad on 21 February. Raveena completed her portions on 28 February. The makers completed major portions in March 2020, with post-production works being kickstarted, but filming came to a halt due to the COVID-19 pandemic lockdown in India.  Prashanth Neel claimed that Sanjay Dutt had completed shooting for the film, with only dubbing for his portions, is pending, after Sanjay Dutt was diagnosed with lung cancer, and left US for immediate treatment on 12 August 2020.

The film was resumed on 26 August 2020 at Bangalore post a gap of 5 months. Malavika Avinash and Prakash Raj joined the sets on this schedule. On 7 October 2020, Yash and Srinidhi Shetty resumed the shoot at Mangalore, with the team entering the final leg of shoot. Sanjay Dutt confirmed that he will join the shooting of the film on November, although he resumed the shooting only in December. The climax action scenes were filmed in December 2020 at Hyderabad, which were choreographed by action director Anbariv. On 20 December 2020, the makers announced that the climax scene of the film was completed. K.G.F: Chapter 2 was produced on a budget of 125 crore, and is the most expensive Kannada film.

Music 

The film's music is composed by Ravi Basrur. The music rights are owned by Lahari Music and T-Series for south languages. The music rights of Hindi version was bought by MRT Music. Music sessions of the film began in April 2019, at Basrur's newly renovated recording studio in Bangalore. However, music production was disrupted in mid-March 2020 due to the COVID-19 pandemic, which was resumed during that May. After work on the film's music and score being completed, Basrur later edited the score and songs, during mid-2021. The Naik Brothers (Laxman and Sandesh Datta), recorded two songs "Toofan" and "Sultan", used in the Hindi-dubbed version of the film. They stated "We went there and he dubbed four songs in Telugu and Kannada in our voice. Later, COVID-19 lockdown happened. After a long wait of two years, they recorded two songs for the Hindi dubbed version titled Toofan and Sultan and finalised for the movie". On 21 March 2022, the first single titled "Toofan" was released from the album. The song depicts the rise of Rocky (Yash) as a saviour of enslaved people in the gold mines of Kolar, as depicted in the predecessor's plot. It crossed over 26 million views within 24 hours of its release. On 6 April 2022, the second single titled "Gagana Nee" was released, On 13 April 2022, the third single titled "Sulthana" was released. On 14 April 2022, the fourth single titled "Mehabooba" was released. On 16 April 2022, the makers released the soundtrack album, containing four songs. On 24 April 2022, the fifth single titled "The Monster Song" was also released.

Marketing 
As a part of the promotional activities, a fictional newspaper named K.G.F Times was designed based on vintage newspapers. Starting from 4 to 10 January 2021, the makers unveiled the new editions of the film through their social media accounts.

The teaser trailer was initially scheduled to release on 8 January 2021, coinciding with Yash's birthday. However, after a few cuts from the teaser leaked through the internet, the makers unveiled the teaser on 7 January, ahead of the official launch. Instead of releasing the teaser in five languages, the makers released it as a single teaser featuring English dialogues. It became the most viewed and most liked teaser. The official trailer of the film was released on 27 March 2022 and became the most watched Indian trailer in 24 hours with 109 million views across five languages.

Release

Theatrical 
K.G.F: Chapter 2 was originally scheduled to release in theatres on 23 October 2020, coinciding with Dussehra festival. However, the release was postponed due to the COVID-19 pandemic in India. In January 2021, the filmmakers announced that it will be released theatrically on 16 July 2021. However, it was postponed again for the same reason. The Karnataka State Anti-Tobacco Cell sent a notice to actor Yash, producer Vijay Kiragandur and filmmaker Prashanth Neel on 11 January 2021 as the makers failed to display the anti-smoking warning message, particularly in the sequences that involve Yash smoking. As per the law, anti-smoking warnings have to be displayed to stop fans from emulating it. On 22 August 2021, the new release date was announced as 14 April 2022. It was released in Kannada and dubbed versions of Telugu, Hindi, Tamil and Malayalam languages. It became the first Kannada movie to release in Greece. It is also the first Kannada film to release in IMAX. It is also the first Kannada film to release in South Korea. It was also the first commercial Kannada movie to release in Pakistan.

Screening 
The movie was reported to release in more than 10,000 screens worldwide. In India, the film will be releasing in over 6000 screens.

Distribution 
KRG Studios acquired the Karnataka distribution rights. The Kerala distribution rights was brought by Prithviraj under the banner Prithviraj Productions. Dream Warrior Pictures acquired the Tamil Nadu distribution rights,
while Andhra Pradesh and Telangana distribution rights were bagged by Varahi Chalana Chitram.

Anil Thadani, Farhan Akhtar and Ritesh Sidhwani acquired the distribution rights for the film's Hindi version under the banner AA Films and Excel Entertainment respectively.

The film was distributed in North America by Sarigama Cinemas. The Europe distribution was done through 4Seasons Creations Cinestaan AA distributed the film in Hindi language across various overseas nations. The United Kingdom distribution was done through Boleyn Cinemas. Radha Krishna Entertainments distributed the film in Australia, New Zealand, Fiji and Papua New Guinea. The film was also distributed in Malaysia, Singapore, GCC regions and African nations.

Home media 
Zee Network acquired the satellite rights of the Kannada, Telugu, Tamil and Malayalam versions. Sony Max acquired the satellite rights of the Hindi version. The film's digital streaming rights are sold to Amazon Prime Video for all five languages.
On 16 May 2022, Amazon Prime Video announced that the film is now available in all five languages for early access rentals at ₹199 on Amazon Prime Video India for both prime and non-prime customers. The film was digitally streamed on Amazon Prime Video from 3 June 2022 in Kannada and dubbed versions of Hindi, Tamil, Telugu and Malayalam languages. The original Kannada-language version of the film was premiered on television on 20 August 2022 on Zee Kannada. The Telugu-language version was premiered on 21 August 2022 on Zee Telugu. The Tamil-language version was premiered on 31 August 2022 on Zee Tamil. The Hindi-language version was premiered on 18 September 2022 on Sony Max.

Critical reception 
K.G.F: Chapter 2 received positive reviews from critics. 

Taran Adarsh of Bollywood Hungama gave the film four and a half stars out of five and was appreciative of all major aspects of production, opining that it "has a fresh, international look and doesn't look like a regional film at all." Subha J. Rao of Firstpost gave the film four stars out of five and found the writing and conception to be "far better" than Chapter 1. Sunayana Suresh of The Times of India also gave it four stars out of five and similarly found that "Neel and Yash have managed to deliver a sequel that seems more immersive than the first part." Vivek MV of Deccan Herald rated the film three and a half stars out of five, as did Janani K of India Today, who described the climax as "cathartic and brilliantly shot" but was critical of the uneven pacing throughout. With three stars out of five, Shuklaji of The News Minute wrote, "Despite the few shortcomings, viewers are bound to recall the film forever for its outrageous imagination and incredible technical finesse."

Bharathi Pradhan of Lehren gave the film two out of five stars and stated that Rocky was "Don Of Indian Dystopia". Rohit Bhatnagar of The Free Press Journal rated the film two and a half stars out of five and wrote "KGF: Chapter 2 has every possible ingredient to impress the janta, but finding realism is a big no-no". Sukanya Verma of Rediff.com gave the film two and a half stars out of five and observed, "Testosterone, not rationale, is the driving force behind the K.G.F franchise," but praised the performances for putting "some muscle on a thin premise," and the production design. Shubhra Gupta of The Indian Express gave one and a half stars out of five and was not impressed with the screenplay or momentum, writing that the film "swings haphazardly between the past and the present."  With two and a half stars out of five, Nandini Ramnath of Scroll.in gave the film two and a half stars out of five and found the film to be "less chaotic" than Chapter 1, but felt it "continues to suffer from leaps in the time-space continuum." Saibal Chatterjee of NDTV rated it two stars out of five and wrote, "The film is the handiwork of people who do not seem to have the foggiest sense of modulation, or of moderation, in the matter of pitching and sound design," but was appreciative of Yash's performance.

Writing for News18, Sonil Dedhia called K.G.F: Chapter 2 an "all-stops pulled out entertainment" film and opined that it "delivers the goods when it comes to non-stop thrills, mood, and style." Monika Rawal Kukreja of Hindustan Times felt the film was "worth the hype and one of the finest sequels to have come out in a long time," and described Yash as "just unmissable." Srivatsan S. of The Hindu labelled the film a "festival of male toxicity" but felt Neel had corrected "some of the wrongs of the first part," writing, "There is only one way to look at K.G.F: Chapter 2 for it to work for you and that is to partake in the madness it offers."

Box office
K.G.F: Chapter 2 collected  worldwide on the first day of its release. On the fourth day of its release, the film crossed  mark at the worldwide box office. On the fifth day of its release, the film grossed more than  worldwide. The movie grossed  in 14 days and became the 4th Indian movie to cross the 1000 crore mark worldwide and the second fastest movie to collect ₹1000 crore, behind Baahubali 2: The Conclusion. While Firstpost reported that the movie grossed 1100 crores, Pinkvilla reported the collection to be ₹1198 crores at the end of tenth week. While The New Indian Express and DNA India reported that the worldwide collection to be around  crore to  crore, The Hindustan Times mentioned the collection as ₹1,207 crore.
News 18, and TV9 Marathi  reported the collection to be  crore. The Times Of India, Vijaya Karnataka, TV9 Kannada and Asianet News reported that the movie grossed ₹1250 crores. India Today reported the collections to be ₹1300 crore. It became the fourth highest-grossing Indian film of all time.

India 
On the first day of release, K.G.F: Chapter 2 collected  at the box office, the second-highest opening day in India after RRR. The film recorded the highest-ever opening day for a Kannada film in Karnataka. It also set opening day records in Malayalam (Kerala). With ₹442 crore gross at the end of four days, it occupied the first spot in the list of highest grossing domestic opening weekend. The Hindi version raked  at the box office on the fifth day of its release. On the fifth day of its release, the Tamil version raked in around 62 lakhs in Chennai alone surpassing the collections of the Tamil film Beast. The Hindi version managed to cross   in 7 days making it the fastest one to do so and broke the previous record held by Baahubali 2: The Conclusion (8 days). The Hindi version collected  in 12 days and became the 10th entrant in the 300 crore club in Hindi-language. The film grossed  in India in 15 days run and become third highest-grossing film in India. The Hindi version earned  in 16 days and became the third highest grossing film in Hindi language. The film grossed ₹100 crores in Tamil Nadu, making it the first Kannada and the second non-Tamil film to do so. With a collection of ₹105.70 crores in 26 days, it became the ninth highest grossing film in Tamil Nadu. With a gross collection of ₹ 22.06 crores, it became the second movie to cross the ₹20 crore mark in West Bengal. It became the first film to gross more than ₹10 crore in Odisha and the fastest to reach the ₹50 crore mark in Kerala. The Tamil version collected over  crore and become 9th highest grosser in Tamil Nadu.

The Hindi version netted more than  breaking the record of Dangal (₹387.38 crore) and climbed to the second position behind Baahubali 2: The Conclusion (₹511 crore). With domestic collections of ₹1000 crores, the film became the second highest grossing film in India. The Hindi version managed to cross the net collection mark of  - making it the second movie to do so after Baahubali 2: The Conclusion. The film recorded 5.05 crore footfalls at the Indian box office in 26 days. The film collected  at the Indian box-office in 33 days and became the second highest-grossing film in India as well as the second Indian movie to gross ₹1000 crore at the domestic market. The gross domestic collection was reported to be ₹1008 crore.

Other territories 
The film debuted at the North American box office by collected more than $1 million in its premiere show. It collected $225,892 from 80 locations in Australia and a further $39,372 from 26 locations in New Zealand on the first day. In first weekend film collected $26,225,842 from 510 screens while Hindi version minted $930,527 from 268 screens in United States of America. In Canada collected $1,117,124 from 55 screens. Film grossed  in United Kingdom from 182 screens. In other countries it collected  in opening weekend. It became the first Kannada film to be screened in South Korea and the longest running Kannada film in Canada. It was also the first film to release in multiple languages simultaneously in Canada. In November 2022, News 18 reported the worldwide gross theatrical collections to be ₹1500 crores.

Future 
The film's mid-credits scene showcased the final draft of K.G.F: Chapter 3, hinting at a sequel. In April 2022, Neel said: "If people love K.G.F: Chapter 2, we could think of continuing the franchise." The same month, executive producer Karthik Gowda confirmed that a sequel was in development and pre-production had begun. In an interview with Variety, Yash stated that he and Neel had conceptualised some scenes for the sequel.

In May 2022, producer Vijay Kiragandur stated they were planning to begin the sequel's production after October 2022, aiming for a 2024 release. "Going forward, we are going to create a Marvel kind of universe. We want to bring different characters from different movies and create something like Doctor Strange," Kiragandur added. However, executive producer Karthik Gowda called it a speculation, tweeting: "Hombale Films will not be starting KGF 3 anytime soon." In June 2022, Neel asserted the possibility of Chapter 3, stating: "We just want to take a big break and we will definitely come back to make that."

Notes

References

External links 
 

2020s Kannada-language films
2022 action drama films
Indian sequel films
Films set in the 1980s
Indian gangster films
Indian action drama films
Period action films
Films shot in Karnataka
Films shot in Hyderabad, India
Films shot at Ramoji Film City
Indian films about revenge
Films directed by Prashanth Neel
Films postponed due to the COVID-19 pandemic
Film productions suspended due to the COVID-19 pandemic
IMAX films